Rehwa Society is a not-for-profit foundation, working with weavers in Maheshwar, Madhya Pradesh. Established in 1978, by Richard and Sally Holkar as a weaver's society. It is known for its Maheshwar sarees, in silk and cotton.

History

The weaving history at Maheshwar, dates back to Maharani Ahilyabai Holkar, the ruler of princely  Indore State from 1765 to 1795. She brought in weavers from Surat in Gujarat and Mandu, Madhya Pradesh and established them at Maheshwar, to weave special nine-yard saris (Navvari saris) for the ladies of royal household, and turban fabric.

The tradition was revived, when the Rehwa Society was founded in 1978, by Richard Holkar of Holkar dynasty and his wife Sally Holkar. Using a grant from the Indian Central Welfare Board, they started with eight looms and eight women weavers from the local Meru community. It is situated within the Ahilya Fort at Maheshwar, on the banks of the Narmada River. Over the years the society has expanded to 250 weavers, most of them women and 110 looms. It is known for weaving Maheshwari sarees and fabric in cotton and silk.

Sally Holkar managed the society till 2003, when we established WomenWeave Charitable Trust, also based in Maheshwar. Thereafter, Mira Sagar who has worked with Rehwa for 20 years, remained the director of Rehwa Society, before starting her own line in 2012.

Since the society is non-profit, the profits are used in employee welfare. A small colony of 45 houses has been built for the employees, which the weavers paid through their work. Besides a school till eighth standard and a creche has also been built.

See also
 Khadi
 Khādī Development and Village Industries Commission (Khadi Gramodyog)

References

External links
 Rehwa Society, Official website

Cooperatives in India
Handloom industry in India
1979 establishments in Madhya Pradesh
Organizations established in 1979
Non-profit organisations based in India
Organisations based in Madhya Pradesh
Tourist attractions in Khargone district